Camille de Toledo (born 25 June 1976, in Lyon, France) is a French writer and a visual artist.

Biography

Camille de Toledo studied history and political science at Sciences Po as well as law and literature at the Paris West University Nanterre La Défense. He then continued his education at the London School of Economics before going on to study cinema and photography at the Tisch School of the Arts in New York.

Upon returning to France in 1996, he founded Don Quichotte, a Zapatist magazine for which he is a photographer and columnist. Camille de Toledo uses the heteronym Oscar Philipsen particularly to sign Rêves, his book published in October 2003 in the Éditions de La Martinière.

In 2004, he received a grant from the Villa Médicis.

In 2005, he began writing the tetralogy. Strates, described as "a fictional archeology". Two of the four installments have been published: L'Inversion de Hieronymus Bosch (ed. Verticales 2005), renamed Au temps des monstres catastrophes in 2011 for the Spanish translation (ed. Alpha Decay, trans Juan Asis), and Vies et mort d'un terroriste américain (ed. Verticales 2007).

Camille de Toledo is also the author of essays that combine different writing styles and genres: autobiographies, critiques, micro-fictions including Le Hêtre et le Bouleau (2009) and L'Adieu au 20e siècle (2002). In 2008, he published an essay response to the manifesto entitled Pour une littérature-monde en francais which was released in March 2007 at the Festival des étonnants voyageurs de Saint-Malo. Entitled Visiter le Flurkistan ou les illusions de la littérature-monde, it's a controversial charge in favor of literature that is philosophically engaged but free from all constraints particularly objectivist, naturalist, or realist and that are much more fundamentally an artificial archeology than a "real" and "authentic" travel experience.

His works are translated in Spain, Italy, Germany, and the United States. Camille de Toledo regularly collaborates with the philosophy, literature, and art magazine, Pylône.

In the spring of 2008, he founded the Sociéte européenne des auteurs with Maren Sell in order to promote translations.

In March 2011, his fragmented novel, Vies pøtentielles appeared in Seuil. It was, according to Domonique Rabaté, a watershed moment for biographies and literature.

At the beginning of 2012, his work, L'Inquiétude d'être au monde, appeared in the Verdier editions. In March 2013, Camille de Toledo wrote the booklet and directed the video for La Chute de Fukuyama, an opera at the Salle Pleyel, composed by Grégoire Hetzel on the September 11 attacks.

Personal life
He is the son of journalist Christine Mital and movie producer Gérard Mital. On his father's side, he descends from a Judeo-Spanish family who originally come from Toledo, Spain, hence the last name "de Toledo". The birthplace of his family is Geneva, Switzerland.

He currently lives in Berlin and is the father of three.

Publications

Essays
 Visiter le Flurkistan ou les illusions de la littérature-monde, PUF, 2007
 Le hêtre et le bouleau. Essai sur la tristesse européenne, Le Seuil, coll. " La Librairie du XXIe siècle ", 2009

Novels
 L'Inversion de Hieronymus Bosch, Verticales, 2005 (En época de monstruos y catástrofes, Alpha Decay, 2012)
 Vies et mort d'un terroriste américain, Verticales, 2007
 Vies pøtentielles, micro-fictions, Seuil, " La Librairie du XXIe siècle ", 2011
 Oublier, trahir, puis disparaître, Le Seuil, coll. " La Librairie du XXIe siècle ", 2014
 "Le Livre de la faim et de la soif", Gallimard, 2017

Collection of Songs
 Rêves, Oscar Philipsen, Éditions de La Martinière, 2003
 L'Inquiétude d'être au monde, Verdier, Chaoïd Collection, January 2012

Opera Booklet and theater 
 La Chute de Fukuyama, on the music of Grégoire Hetzel, created in March 2013 in Paris.
 Sur une île, put on stage by Christophe Bergon in 2016 at "Theatre Garonne", Toulouse

Filmographie
 2001 : Tango de l'oubli, Whoopy Movies production, Official Selection, Festival de Cannes, New York Film Festival, Festival international du film de Mar del Plata
 2003 : Gêne-s-ration, 52 minutes, Arte/Coup d'œil, documentary
 2003 : Racontez-nous, Anna, 70 minutes, experimental video
 2003 : The story of my brother, 26 minutes, video issue in the series Cinéma Pauvre
 2006 : Running Always, 10 minutes, video issue in the series Cinéma pauvre
 2007 : Vince, 26 ans, 10 minutes, video issue in the series Cinéma pauvre
 2011 : What will happen to silence, 8 minutes, video issue in the series Hantologies
 2011 : How many pages, 5 minutes, video issue in the series Hantologies

References

External links
 Toledo Archives
 Camille de Toledo – Editions Verticales
 Camille de Toledo – Editions Seuil

1975 births
Living people
21st-century French novelists
Sciences Po alumni
French photographers
French male novelists
Writers from Lyon
21st-century French male writers